MICIVIH from the French acronym for Mission Civile Internationale en Haïti. In 1993, the mission was created with the daunting task of promoting and protecting human rights in the country, under the military junta of Gen. Raoul Cédras. After its establishment, the international community learned that innocent people were killed, tortured, kidnapped and arbitrarily arrested by the FAdH military and FRAPH paramilitary units.

Micivih achievements at the national level

Micivih assisted in persuading to stop the military junta commanded by Gen. Raoul Cedras, and therefore, put a halt in the violations of human rights inflicted by the military. The mission assisted in the dismantling of the old military system and in the creation of a new police force, trained and aware of the respect for human rights. It propitiated a more civilized environment, in the political and social aspects. A requirement to achieve future economic development desperately needed in this impoverished country.

Micivih achievements at the international level

The mission encouraged the expansion of human right presences and the creation of new offices of human rights, in countries similarly affected by the violation of human rights. It also contributed to the opening of the office for the United Nations High Commissioner for Human Rights, the bureau that oversees all activities of the UN system, related to human rights.

References

Amnesty International Article on FRAPH https://web.archive.org/web/20101205233613/http://www.amnesty.ca/amnestynews/upload/AMR3601304.pdf
Office of the High Commissioner for Human Rights OHCHR, www.ohchr.org/

Human rights in Haiti